Military urbanism is the militarization of urban areas. This can include changes to built environments in military conflict areas or modifications of cityscapes to strengthen or subvert control by authorities. Military urbanism concerns the planning and implementation processes by which areas are fortified and militarized.

See also 
 SWAT
 Paramilitary
 Riot control
 Urban warfare
 Urban guerrilla warfare

Further reading 
Board, Christopher. New Insights in Cartographic Communication. University of Toronto Press, 1984.

External links 
 Subtopia: A Field Guide to Military Urbanism 

Military terminology